Antonio Corsi (Florence, 1630 – Florence, 1679) was a noble Italian, first Count of Montepescali and Third Marquis of Caiazzo, son of the Marquis Giovanni Corsi and the Patrizia of Firenze Lucrezia Salviati, brother of Domenico Maria Corsi.   

__toc__

Life 
Antonio was born on 1625 in Florence to Giovanni Corsi and Lucrezia Salviati.  

With a sovereign concession made by the Kingdom of Sicily in 1642 by Philip IV of Spain, Antonio got the highest title of Count of Montepescali.  When his father died in 1661, he inherited the inferior title Marquis of Caiazzo, accumulating two titles, ending up selling the Marquisate to Giovanni di Antonio di Corso Corsi, of Domenico's Branch, who was also son of Giovanna Boni, powerful noble family of Lucca of ancient Silk Merchants, keeping the title in the family.  

He married the Patrizia of Firenze Giulia Corsini in 1656, having only one child in 1666 called Giovanni, who was the best friend of Cosimo III de' Medici, Grand Duke of Tuscany and became also Governor of Civitavecchia. 

Antonio died in 1679

References

External links 

Antonio Corsi of Montepescali
1630 births
1679 deaths
Nobility from Florence